Béla Goldoványi (20 December 1925 in Budapest – 16 November 1972 in Budapest) was a Hungarian athlete, who mainly competed in the 100 metres.

He competed for Hungary in the men's 4 x 100 metre relay at the 1952 Summer Olympics held in Helsinki, Finland, where he won the bronze medal with his team mates László Zarándi, Géza Varasdi and György Csányi.

Competition record

References

1925 births
1972 deaths
Hungarian male sprinters
Athletes (track and field) at the 1948 Summer Olympics
Athletes (track and field) at the 1952 Summer Olympics
Athletes (track and field) at the 1956 Summer Olympics
Olympic athletes of Hungary
Olympic bronze medalists for Hungary
Athletes from Budapest
European Athletics Championships medalists
Medalists at the 1952 Summer Olympics
Olympic bronze medalists in athletics (track and field)